The Talbot Odyssey is a 1984 novel by American author, Nelson DeMille.

Plot
Tony Abrams, a former police detective who served at the NYPD's Intelligence Division is working as the office's investigator for the O'Brien, Kimberly, and Rose law firm of New York. He stumbles upon a swirl of intrigue that leads to discovery that for over forty years there is an active mole, code-named Talbot, within the CIA.

Talbot's mission is to carry out a secret plan devised by rogue elements in the USSR government, to attack the United States with a first-strike weapon, an unprecedented attack that would cause a mortal blow to the country. It is up to Abrams and the lawyer Katherine Kimberly to stop him.

References 

1984 American novels
Novels by Nelson DeMille